City Stadium may refer to:

Belarus
 City Stadium (Molodechno), a multi-use stadium
 City Stadium (Orsha), a multi-purpose stadium
 City Stadium (Slutsk), a multi-use stadium

Montenegro
 City Stadium (Gusinje), a football stadium in Montenegro
 Podgorica City Stadium, Podgorica, Montenegro

United Kingdom
 City Stadium, Bradford, a greyhound track in West Yorkshire, England
 Cardiff City Stadium, Cardiff, Wales
 City of Manchester Stadium, Manchester, England
 City Stadium (Livingston) or Almondvale Stadium, a football stadium in West Lothian, Scotland
 City Stadium, Norwich, a greyhound racing stadium in Norfolk, England

United States
 City Stadium (Green Bay), Green Bay, Wisconsin
 City Stadium (Lynchburg), a sports venue in Virginia
 City Stadium (Richmond), Richmond, Virginia

Elsewhere
 Nairobi City Stadium, Kenya
 City Stadium, Penang, Georgetown, Penang, Malaysia
 Skopje City Stadium or Philip II Arena, Skopje, North Macedonia
 City Stadium (Poznań) or Stadion Miejski, Poznań, Poland
 City Stadium, Ternopil or Ternopilsky Misky Stadion, Ternopil, Ukraine

See also
 
 Central City Stadium (disambiguation)
 Gradski Stadion (disambiguation) ("City Stadium")
 Stadion Miejski (disambiguation) ("City Stadium")